General elections were held in Bolivia on December 6, 2009, following a constitutional referendum held on 25 January 2009. Voters elected:

President and Vice President of the Republic.
130 members of the Chamber of Deputies.
36 members of the Senate.

The five departments which had not already done so all voted to have departmental autonomy. Eleven  municipalities voted to have indigenous autonomy, out of twelve holding such referendums. One province voted to have regional autonomy.

Presidential candidates
Under the new constitution, all previous terms will not be considered for term limits. If any candidate fails to win over 50% of the vote and another candidate is within 10%, a second round will be held. It was the first time that an incumbent President ran for reelection. The presidential candidates were:

Evo Morales (Movement for Socialism): incumbent president, the first of indigenous identity. He is Aymara.
Manfred Reyes Villa (Plan Progress for Bolivia – National Convergence): former prefect of the Cochabamba Department.
René Joaquino (Social Alliance): Mayor of Potosí
Samuel Doria Medina (Frente de Unidad Nacional)
Alejo Véliz (Pueblos por la Libertad y Soberanía)
Ana María Flores (Movimiento de Unidad Social Patriótica)
Rime Choquehuanca (Bolivia Social Demócrata)
Román Loayza (Gente)

Opinion polls
Polling prior to the election indicated that incumbent Evo Morales enjoyed a 55% approval rating, as well as an 18-point lead over his closest challenger Manfred Reyes Villa. As Morales was expected to cruise to reelection, the local press reported that Villa has already purchased an airplane ticket to the United States for the 7th (the day after the election).

Results

Evo Morales won a convincing victory, with 64.22% of the vote. His party, Movement for Socialism, won a two-thirds majority in both the Chamber of Deputies and the Senate.

Autonomy referendums

Departments
The five departments which had not already done so all voted to become autonomous departments. Each will have to produce a statute of autonomy. They were:
Chuquisaca Department—79% voting yes
Cochabamba Department—76.8% voting yes
La Paz Department—79.6% voting yes
Oruro Department—73.1% voting yes
Potosí Department—73.9% voting yes

Regional autonomy
The Gran Chaco Province in Tarija held a referendum on regional autonomy, which was approved by 80.4% of voters.

Municipalities
The following municipalities voted on whether to become autonomous municipalities according to the  Indigenous Originary Campesino Autonomy provisions of the 2009 Constitution. Eleven voted yes:
Huacaya Municipality (Chuquisaca Department) – 53.7% of voters in favor of autonomy
Tarabuco Municipality (Chuquisaca Department) – 90.8%
Mojocoya Municipality (Chuquisaca Department) – 88.3%
Charazani Municipality (La Paz Department) – 86.6%
Jesús de Machaca Municipality (La Paz Department) – 56.1%
Pampa Aullagas Municipality (Oruro Department) – 83.7%
San Pedro de Totora Municipality (Oruro Department) -- 74.5%
Chipaya Municipality (Oruro Department) -- 91.9%
Salinas de Garci Mendoza Municipality (Oruro Department) -- 75.1%
Chayanta Municipality (Potosí Department) – 60%
Charagua Municipality (Santa Cruz Department) – 55.7%
One municipality voted no:
Curahuara de Carangas Municipality

References

Elections in Bolivia
Bolivia
General
Presidential elections in Bolivia